The men's 400 metre individual medley event at the 1964 Summer Olympics took place on 12–14 October. This swimming event used medley swimming. Because an Olympic size swimming pool is 50 metres long, this race consisted of eight lengths of the pool. The first two lengths were swum using the butterfly stroke, the second pair with the backstroke, the third pair of lengths in breaststroke, and the final two were freestyle.  Unlike other events using freestyle, swimmers could not use butterfly, backstroke, or breaststroke for the freestyle leg; most swimmers use the front crawl in freestyle events.

Medalists

Results

Heats
Heat 1

Heat 2

Heat 3

Heat 4

Final

Key: WR = World record

References

Men's Individual Medley 400 metre
Men's events at the 1964 Summer Olympics